Turner Ladd Stevenson (born May 18, 1972) is a Canadian former professional ice hockey right winger who played 13 seasons in the National Hockey League (NHL) for the Montreal Canadiens, New Jersey Devils, and Philadelphia Flyers. He won the Stanley Cup with New Jersey in 2003.

Playing career
Drafted 12th overall in the 1990 NHL Entry Draft by the Montreal Canadiens, Stevenson played his first nine professional seasons with the Canadiens. Left exposed in the 2000 NHL Expansion Draft, he was claimed by the Columbus Blue Jackets, who then sent him to the New Jersey Devils to complete a previous trade involving Krzysztof Oliwa. He spent the next four seasons with New Jersey, winning the Stanley Cup in 2003. Following the 2003–04 season, he signed a three-year contract with the Philadelphia Flyers. Stevenson only played 31 games with the Flyers during a 2005–06 season in which he struggled due to hip problems and the Flyers bought him out following the season. He retired on April 13, 2007, and became an assistant coach with the Seattle Thunderbirds, the team he played for prior to his professional career.

Personal Info
Born and raised in the small northern community of Mackenzie, British Columbia, Stevenson began playing hockey at an early age on a small skating rink constructed next to his home in the Gantahaz Lake area.

As of 2019, Stevenson lives in Seattle, where he coaches for the Everett Silvertips junior hockey team.

Awards
 1991–92: West First All-Star Team (WHL)
 1991–92: Memorial Cup All-Star Team (CHL)
 2002–03: Stanley Cup New Jersey Devils (NHL)

Career statistics

Regular season and playoffs

International

References

External links
 

1972 births
Canadian ice hockey right wingers
Fredericton Canadiens players
Ice hockey people from British Columbia
Living people
Montreal Canadiens draft picks
Montreal Canadiens players
National Hockey League first-round draft picks
New Jersey Devils players
Sportspeople from Prince George, British Columbia
Philadelphia Flyers players
Seattle Thunderbirds players
Stanley Cup champions